Glody Likonza (born 10 May 1998) is a Congolese professional footballer who plays as attacking midfielder for Mazembe and the DR Congo national team.

Professional career
Likonza began his senior career with the Congolese club Mazembe in the Linafoot. He joined the Belgian club Standard Liège on a one-year loan with option to buy on 30 August 2021. On 31 January 2022, the loan was terminated early without him making any appearances for Standard.

International career
Likonza made his debut with the DR Congo national team in a 3–2 friendly loss to Rwanda on 18 September 2019.

References

External links
 
 
 FDB Profile
 TP Mazembe Profile

1998 births
Living people
Footballers from Kinshasa
Democratic Republic of the Congo footballers
Democratic Republic of the Congo international footballers
Association football midfielders
TP Mazembe players
Standard Liège players
Linafoot players
Democratic Republic of the Congo expatriate footballers
Democratic Republic of the Congo expatriates in Belgium
Expatriate footballers in Belgium